The Kuvend of Dukagjin is a Cultural Monument of Albania. The word Kuvend in the Albanian Kanun means convention and was a particular and regulated form of parliament.

References

Cultural Monuments of Albania